Gebrüder Weiss–Oberndorfer is a continental cycling team founded in 2008. It is based in Austria and it participates in UCI Continental Circuits races.

Team roster

Major wins
2009
Stage 4 Tour of Austria, Jan Bárta
2010
 time trial championships, Gregor Gazvoda
Stage 2 Tour of Qinghai Lake, Gregor Gazvoda
2011
Overall Tour of Szeklerland, Florian Bissinger
Stage 2, Florian Bissinger
2014
Stage 4 Grand Prix of Sochi, Michael Gogl
 time trial championships, Gregor Gazvoda

References

External links

UCI Continental Teams (Europe)
Cycling teams based in Austria
Cycling teams established in 2008